Cholado or Raspao is an icy beverage with fresh fruit and sweetened condensed milk traditional from Jamundí, in the region of Valle del Cauca, Colombia. It is made from crushed ice or shaved ice, chopped fruit, condensed milk, fruit syrup, and served with a wafer cookie, sometimes topped with whipped cream and shredded cheese. The common fruits that are used in the preparation include banana, apple, kiwi, strawberry, papaya, pineapple, mango, and soursop.

See also
Colombian cuisine
Granizado
Halo halo
Chamoyada

References

Cholado
Cholado